Skeeby is a village and civil parish about  north-west of the county town of Northallerton in the Richmondshire district of North Yorkshire, England.

History

Skeeby was recorded as Schirebi in the Domesday Book – the description being: "In Skeeby there are six carucates and there could be four ploughs there". In other early references to the village it is known as Schireby in the 11th century, Scythebi and Scideby in the 12th century, Schideby, Skitteby and Skytheby in the 13th and 14th centuries and finally Skeitby or Skeby in the 16th century.

The origins of Skeeby Bridge, over Gilling Beck, date from the early 14th century, the existing structure being a 17th-century Grade II listed structure that was widened by John Carr in 1781/2. The earliest remaining buildings in the village date from the 17th and 18th centuries.
In 1870-72, John Marius Wilson's Imperial Gazetteer of England and Wales described Skeeby:
SKEEBY, a township in Easby parish, N. R. Yorkshire; 2½ miles ENE of Richmond. Acres, 770. Real property, £1,234. Pop., 180. Houses, 42.

Governance

The village lies within the Richmond (Yorks) parliamentary constituency, which was represented from 1989 to 2015 by Conservative William Hague. It also lies within the Richmondshire North electoral division of North Yorkshire County Council and the Middleton Tyas ward of Richmondshire District Council.

Geography

Skeeby is located on the A6108 road, the main road between Richmond and Scotch Corner, linking with the A66 and A1(M) motorway. The nearest settlements to Skeeby are Richmond,  to the west and Gilling West . A small beck flows through the village, as well as Gilling Beck which becomes Skeeby Beck and flows under Skeeby Bridge, as a consequence the main road and farmland surrounding Gilling Beck are prone to flooding. Skeeby Beck flows into the River Swale just above Brompton-on-Swale.

Demography

2011 census

The 2011 UK census showed that the population was split 44.3% male to 55.7% female. The religious constituency was made of 75.1% Christian, 0.8% Buddhist, 0.3% Muslim, 0.3% Other religions and the rest stating no religion or not stating at all. The ethnic make-up was 97.5% White British, 0.6% British Asian and 0.8% each White Other . There were 188 dwellings.

Community and culture

Education for the village children is provided by three primary schools in nearby Richmond (CE, Methodist and St Mary's). Pupils then receive secondary education at Richmond School & Sixth Form College. The public house, the Traveller's Rest, was closed in 2008 and since then there have been many negotiations by the community-founded "Skeeby Community Pub Society" in order to purchase the pub back for the villagers.  the pub is still boarded up and awaiting a decision on its future. The village shop, known as "Skeeby Stores" and the post office are also now no longer in business, the store premises have since been refurbished, awaiting new ownership, while the old post office is a cottage.

Religion

The church, dedicated to St Agatha was built in 1840, being used as a second chapel of ease to the larger and older church of St Agatha, at nearby Easby Abbey. It served both as a church and a school, until the school moved across the road during Victorian times, into what is now a residential abode. There was also a Wesleyan chapel, which has now also been converted into a residence.

References

External links

Villages in North Yorkshire
Civil parishes in North Yorkshire